This Feeling Gets Old is the 2nd full-length album by metalcore band Kid Gorgeous released in 2003 on Uprising Records.

Track listing 
"Anyone Ever Tell You That You Talk Too Much" – 1:59
"Morrissey Was Right" – 3:27
"I Know a Girl Names Disease" – 2:44
"Suicide Solves Everything"  – 2:41
"(Intermission)" – 0:57
"For Those Who Have Trouble Breaking Glass" – 3:19
"Rather Touch Than Talk" – 2:48
"My Life as a Bridge" – 6:12
"I Hate Myself and I Want to Die (Nirvana Cover)" – 3:23
"Untitiled" – 2:51

Personnel 
John McCarthy - Guitar
Erik Boccio -   Vocals
Jesse Muscato - Drums
Ryan Besch - Bass

2003 albums
Kid Gorgeous albums